Beitbridge  is a border town in the province of Matabeleland South, Zimbabwe. The name also refers to the border post and bridge spanning the Limpopo River, which forms the political border between South Africa and Zimbabwe. The border on the South African side of the river is also named Beitbridge.

Background
The town lies just north of the Limpopo River about 1 km from the Alfred Beit Road Bridge which spans the Limpopo between South Africa and Zimbabwe. According to the 2012 population census, the town had a population of 41,767 dominated by the Venda and Ndebele people . There is a sizable percentage of Shona people from other provinces this is a busy border post with traders from all over Zimbabwe. 
The Beitbridge border post is the busiest road border post in Southern Africa, and is best avoided during busy border-crossing seasons.

Climate

The Town
Beitbridge has an estimated 2,570 houses in formal settlements (primarily for government officials and mid-level private sector staff) and 3,000 in informal settlements. Formal-settlement dwellings are mainly two- to three-room brick houses, while those in the informal settlements are among the worst mud houses in Zimbabwe. The mud houses have since been demolished. Average house occupancy in the low-income and informal settlements varies considerably, as many people do not bring their families to Beitbridge, but includes at least four people. Recreational facilities are limited in low-income areas, consisting largely of bars and soccer pitches.

Labour
The major sources of local employment—freight, retail, construction, customs and the police—employ about 1,200 people. Informal sector activities—primarily vending and sex work—are as large as those in the formal sector, employing about 1,400. Outside Beitbridge town, farming is a major employer. A diamond mine recently closed, increasing unemployment and poverty. Most women rely on vending, sex work and cross-border trading for income. Truckers are present in the area with work coming from the border area of South Africa.

The Bridge
The Alfred Beit Road Bridge is named after Alfred Beit, founder of the De Beers diamond mining company and business associate of Cecil Rhodes. He was also a director of a number of companies, among them the British South Africa Company and Rhodesia Railways. The original bridge was constructed in 1929 at a cost of $600,000 and financed jointly between the Beit Railways Trust and the South African Railways. The new bridge was completed in 1995, and was officially opened on 24 November. It was built by the Zimbabwean Government, which now benefits from the tolls levied on crossings. The new bridge can accommodate much heavier traffic than the old one could, which is now for rail traffic only.

Development

On the South African side of the border the N1 Highway connects this border post to the main economic centres of Pretoria (463 km) and Johannesburg (521 km). The closest town is Musina (16 km). On the Zimbabwean side of the border post the road splits in two, with the A6 running to Bulawayo and the R1 to Masvingo. A railway also passes through this border post, side by side with the road, and splits into a line to Bulawayo and a line to Gweru via Rutenga.

Three railway lines meet at Beitbridge: the South African Spoornet line to Polokwane, the National Railways of Zimbabwe line to Gweru via Rutenga and the Beitbridge Bulawayo Railway.

Education 
There are four primary schools in the town namely Beitbridge Mission, Beitbridge Government, Dulivhadzimo Primary and St Mary's Primary School. There is a private school in the town named under Oakleigh House Trust School. Two secondary schools Vhembe High School and St Joseph's Secondary School cater for the post primary education in the town. There is no tertiary education facility in the town and high school graduates travel to district outside Beitbridge for tertiary education.

Venue  
Dulivhadzimu Stadium, a small multi-purpose arena in the town was chosen by the ZANU-PF led 21st February Movement to host the annual national celebration of Robert Mugabe's date of birth on Saturday, 23 February 2008. On 21 February, two days before, Mugabe had turned 84. It was reported that workers repaired the potholes on the main roads in the city to make sure Mugabe's motorcade moved swiftly with a measure of comfort.

See also
 Bulawayo
 Matabeleland South
 Musina
 Mwenezi District

References

External links
 Covid-19 poser as trucks overwhelm Beitbridge Border Post As of 12 June 2020.

 
Populated places in Zimbabwe
Matabeleland South Province
South Africa–Zimbabwe border crossings